The Walls Farm Barn and Corn Crib were historic farm outbuildings in rural southern Lonoke County, Arkansas.  The barn was a two-story gable-roofed structure, with a broad central hall and a shed-roof extension to one side.  The corn crib was a single story frame structure, with a gable-roofed center and shed-roofed extensions around each side.  They were built c. 1907–08, and were relatively unaltered examples of period farm architecture when they were listed on the National Register of Historic Places in 1995.  The buildings have been listed as destroyed in the Arkansas Historic Preservation Program database.

See also
 Martindale Corn Crib: NRHP-listed in White County, Arkansas
 National Register of Historic Places listings in Lonoke County, Arkansas

References

Barns on the National Register of Historic Places in Arkansas
Buildings and structures completed in 1907
Demolished buildings and structures in Arkansas
National Register of Historic Places in Lonoke County, Arkansas
1907 establishments in Arkansas
Agricultural buildings and structures on the National Register of Historic Places in Arkansas
Maize production